Renato Pietro Mori (May 29, 1935 – August 22, 2014) was an Italian actor and voice actor.

Biography
Born in Milan, Mori started his career in the 1950s, appearing on several television series and acting on stage. Starting from the 1970s, he was often cast in roles of inspectors, police commissioners and men in uniform in poliziotteschi and crime films and TV-series, notably Il marsigliese and La piovra.

Mori was also very active as a voice actor and a dubber. A co-founder of Sefit, the largest Italian company of dubbing, he was the official Italian voice of Morgan Freeman as well as often dubbing James Earl Jones and John Rhys-Davies, among other actors. He also substituted for his colleague Sergio Fiorentini as the Italian voice of Gene Hackman.

Personal life
Mori was the father of Simone Mori, who is also a voice actor.

Death
Mori died on 22 August 2014 at the age of 79 of a very long illness which caused him to retire from his career since 2011.

Partial filmography
Sword of the Conqueror (1961)
Uno dei tre (1972)
E cominciò il viaggio nella vertigine (1974) – Lepa
Bruciati da cocente passione (1976)
Free Hand for a Tough Cop (1976)
Lobster for Breakfast (1979) – Sommelier
Assassinio sul Tevere (1979) – commissioner Galbiati
I Hate Blondes (1980) – Literary Agent
Delitti, amore e gelosia (1982)
Pizza Connection (1985) – Commissioner Giovanni Astarita
Voyage à Rome (1992) – Le contrôleur (uncredited)
Power and Lovers (1994) – Turi
Banditi (1995) – Karl

Dubbing roles

Animation
John Silver in Treasure Planet
Colonel Hathi in The Jungle Book 2
Colonel Hathi in Jungle Cubs
Looking Glass in Happily Ever After
Black Rabbit in Watership Down
Robot Santa in Futurama: Bender's Big Score
Gordy in Open Season
Long John Silver in The Pagemaster
Wylie Burp in An American Tail: Fievel Goes West
Chef in South Park
Chef in South Park: Bigger, Longer & Uncut
Zed in Men in Black: The Series
Cornelius in Once Upon a Forest
Theseus in Midsummer Dream
Rudnick in Heavy Metal (1996 redub)
Norman in Raw Toonage
Norman in Marsupilami

Live action
A.Z. Drones in Johnny Handsome
Eddie "Scrap-Iron" Dupris in Million Dollar Baby
God in Bruce Almighty
William Somerset in Seven
Harry Stevenson in Feast of Love
William Cabot in The Sum of All Fears
Carter Chambers in The Bucket List
John Rawlins in Glory
Nelson Mandela in Invictus
Leonard White in The Bonfire of the Vanities
Billy Ford in Outbreak
Hibble in Moll Flanders
Alex Cross in Kiss the Girls
Alex Cross in Along Came a Spider
Lucius Fox in Batman Begins
Lucius Fox in The Dark Knight
Theodore Joadson in Amistad
Jim in Hard Rain
Tom Beck in Deep Impact
Victor Benezet in Under Suspicion
Charlie in Nurse Betty
Charlie Grimes in High Crimes
Abraham Curtis in Dreamcatcher
Miles Evans in Levity
Walter Crewes in The Big Bounce
Sam in Unleashed
Moses Ashford in Edison
Mitch Bradley in An Unfinished Life
The Boss in Lucky Number Slevin
Morgan Freeman in 10 Items or Less
Narrator in The Love Guru
Harry Caul in The Conversation
Roy Tucker in The Domino Principle
John Herod in The Quick and the Dead
William Sherman Foster in March or Die
Johnny Gallagher in The Package
Max Millan in Scarecrow
Kibby Womack in Lucky Lady
Pete Van Wherry in Reds
Harry Moseby in Night Moves
Jimmy "Popeye" Doyle in French Connection II
George Crook in Geronimo: An American Legend
Avery Tolar in The Firm
Lowell Kolchek in Postcards from the Edge
MacArthur Stern in Loose Cannons
Nicholas Porter Earp in Wyatt Earp
James Greer in The Hunt for Red October
James Greer in Patriot Games
James Greer in Clear and Present Danger
Bernard Abbott in Sneakers
"Goody" Nelson in Gardens of Stone
John Dolby in Clean Slate
Terence Mann in Field of Dreams
Roscoe Jenkins Sr. in Welcome Home Roscoe Jenkins
Quint in Jaws
Doyle Lonnegan in The Sting
Sallah in Indiana Jones and the Raiders of the Lost Ark
Sallah in Indiana Jones and the Last Crusade
Gimli in The Lord of the Rings: The Fellowship of the Ring
Gimli in The Lord of the Rings: The Return of the King
Leonid Pushkin in The Living Daylights
Viscount Mabrey in The Princess Diaries 2: Royal Engagement
Will Teasle in First Blood
Dennis Meechum in Best Seller
Raymond Horgan in Presumed Innocent
Father Kelly in Stolen Summer
Jasper O'Shea in Assault on Precinct 13
Ross Maclure in The Presidio
Al Grossman in Night and the City
Moe in Guilty as Sin
Saul Tuttle in While You Were Sleeping
Eddie Davers in Bulworth
Pops McKenna in Dirty Work
Bill Devaney in The Bodyguard
Speet in First Kid
Jim Toller in Enough
Cobb in Hard Luck
Mr. Stewart in The Search for Santa Paws
Joe Leon in The Specialist
Mr. Hammerman in Carpool
Father Kovak in End of Days
Louis Mead in Crazy in Alabama
Guy Banister in JFK
Ted Marx in Switched at Birth
Santa Claus in Elf
Sam Baines in Back to the Future
George C. Marshall in Saving Private Ryan
Bookseller in Oliver Twist
Chief Zed in Men in Black
Chief Zed in Men in Black II
Perry White in Superman IV: The Quest for Peace
Aragog in Harry Potter and the Chamber of Secrets
Agent Bilkins in The Fast and the Furious
Agent Bilkins in 2 Fast 2 Furious
Hulk in The Incredible Hulk
Leo Dalcò in 1900
Crowning in Once Upon a Time in America
K. Edgar Singer in Muppets from Space
Charles Wheeler in Philadelphia
Earl Partridge in Magnolia
R.K. Maroon in Who Framed Roger Rabbit
James Morse in Pretty Woman
Jack Dragna in Bugsy
Ghost of Christmas Past in Scrooged
Tom Broadbent in Cape Fear
David Kibner in Invasion of the Body Snatchers

References

External links

 
 
 

1935 births
2014 deaths
Male actors from Milan
Italian male film actors
Italian male stage actors
Italian male television actors
Italian male voice actors
Italian male radio actors
Italian voice directors
20th-century Italian male actors
21st-century Italian male actors